Donald Francis Draper, born  Richard “Dick” Whitman, is a fictional character and the protagonist of the AMC television series Mad Men (2007–2015), portrayed by Jon Hamm. Up to the Season 3 finale, Draper was creative director of fictional Manhattan advertising firm Sterling Cooper. He then became a founding partner at a new firm, Sterling Cooper Draper Pryce, after he and his superiors left their previous agency in advance of an unwanted acquisition. The agency later merged with a rival firm, Cutler Gleason & Chaough, to become Sterling Cooper & Partners while pursuing a contract from Chevrolet.

The character of Don Draper is partially inspired by Draper Daniels, a creative director at Leo Burnett advertising agency in Chicago in the 1950s, who worked on the Marlboro Man campaign; and by Bill Backer, an advertising executive at McCann Erickson who created the "I'd Like to Buy the World a Coke" ad in 1971.

Character biography

Early life 
Donald Francis Draper is revealed through flashbacks to be the assumed identity of Richard "Dick" Whitman, born in Bunbury, Illinois in 1926 to Evangeline (Kelly Huddleston), a prostitute, and an abusive, alcoholic farmer, Archibald "Archie" Whitman (Joseph Culp). His mother died in labor, and his father was kicked to death by a spooked horse, which the 10-year-old Dick witnessed.

Dick was raised primarily by a stepmother, Archie's wife Abigail (Brynn Horrocks), who treated him cruelly because she saw him as a reminder of her husband's infidelity. At the time of his father's death, she was pregnant and posthumously gave birth to Dick's half-brother, naming him Adam. The one person to show him any kindness as a child was his stepfather, "Uncle Mack" (Morgan Rusler), who taught him how to survive in the real world. Mack was "with" Abigail's sister Ernestine (Julie Alexander) and ran the brothel in Pennsylvania Coal County where Dick and Adam grew up. When Dick was around 15 years old, his "aunt" died and Dick was a pallbearer for the first time at her funeral. 

Many years later, one of the prostitutes at the brothel had Dick pickpocket valuables from trousers while she was turning tricks, for which he would be paid Hershey bars. Don recalls eating these as the closest he ever got to a normal childhood. One of his few exposures to the outside world was the story of Milton Hershey and his school for orphaned children, and he wondered why he failed to qualify for such a place, considering both his parents were deceased, which made him think he was forgotten. 

During this period of his life, he began to suffer from croup and was left under the care of a prostitute named Aimée (Megan Ferguson). She took his virginity in a way that creator Matthew Weiner stated concerned "his relationship to sex and molestation", and reviewer Abigail Rine described more directly as rape.

Korean War and change in identity 
Whitman never finished high school, and in his early 20s he ran away to enlist in the United States Army during the Korean War in 1950. Once deployed, he served under the command of Lieutenant Donald Francis Draper (Troy Ruptash), a combat engineer under orders to build a field hospital with only Whitman and shovels to assist him; all of Draper's previous subordinates either deserted, or were captured or killed.

During an enemy artillery attack, Whitman caused an explosion by accident, killing Draper instantly. A seriously wounded Whitman switched Draper's dog tags with his own before passing out. He later awakened in a U.S. Army field hospital, presumed to be Draper, and was subsequently awarded the Purple Heart. He was sent home on a train with Draper's coffin (believed to be Whitman's) to offer the Army's regrets to Whitman's survivors. He avoided meeting the Whitmans at the train station but was spotted by Adam (Jay Paulson), whose parents failed to recognize him. Years later in 1960, Adam tracks his half-brother down in New York, but "Draper" insists on leaving the past behind and coldly rejects him, paying him off with $5,000 in cash to keep the identity theft secret. Months later, Dick learns Adam took this so hard he hanged himself. 

Whitman began his life anew as Don Draper, working as a used-car salesman. Anna M. Draper (Melinda Page Hamilton), widow of the real Don Draper, tracked him down. He informed her of Don's death and confessed to his masquerade. The two formed a close bond that continued for many years. Anna remains a close friend and confidante until her death from bone cancer in 1965.

Life as "Don Draper" 
The new Don Draper relocated to New York City, where he worked as a fur salesman and attended City College at night. With the support of his boss, he wrote advertising copy for the fur company, helping him build a portfolio along with some spec ads. At this job in 1953 Draper met his future wife, Elizabeth "Betty" Hofstadt (January Jones), a model who was photographed for one of his own ads. After a chance meeting at the store, he tricked a drunken Roger Sterling (John Slattery) into offering him a job at Sterling Cooper, where he eventually became Creative Director.

He was considered a major asset to the company, as he had considerable talent for understanding the desires of others and for effectively pitching and selling ideas. Because of this, he was occasionally courted by other advertising firms. Although he kept his true character heavily guarded, almost everyone at the firm was portrayed as respecting his talent. At the same time, many in the firm were also troubled by Draper's erratic behavior.

Peggy Olson (Elisabeth Moss)  began her career in 1960 at Sterling Cooper as Draper's secretary, but with her boss's support she became a copywriter. Throughout the series their relationship was portrayed as one of trust and mutual respect, even as Peggy advanced in her career and eventually left the firm.

Draper and Betty were married in May 1953 and eventually moved into a house with an address shown as 42 Bullet Park Road, Ossining in Westchester County, New York. They had three children - Sally (Kiernan Shipka), born in 1954 or early 1955; Bobby (Maxwell Huckabee), born in 1957 or early 1958; and Gene, born in 1963. The marriage was a rocky one, with Draper having numerous affairs. They filed for divorce in 1964 after Betty discovered his true identity, and she later married Republican political operative Henry Francis (Christopher Stanley). Don married his secretary, Megan Calvet (Jessica Paré), and they moved to a stylish, Upper East Side apartment on Park Avenue.

In December 1963, Draper persuaded Bert Cooper (Robert Morse), Roger Sterling, and Lane Pryce (Jared Harris), along with Peggy Olson, Pete Campbell (Vincent Kartheiser), Joan Holloway (Christina Hendricks), and Harry Crane (Rich Sommer), to leave Sterling Cooper rather than take their chances when they learn their parent company was to be purchased by rival firm McCann Erickson. They formed a new agency, Sterling Cooper Draper Pryce (SCDP), working out of a hotel suite before moving to the Time-Life Building. Draper also led a later merger with a rival agency. While the new agency (rebranded Sterling Cooper & Partners, SC&P) was successful, at the end of Season 6, he was forced to take "a leave of absence" from the new firm because of his erratic behavior, which cost the firm a possible advertising account with Hershey Chocolate.

Draper worked as a freelancer for a year while still technically on SC&P's payroll. Megan had moved to Los Angeles to pursue her acting career and asked him for a divorce. Feeling guilty over his past infidelities, Draper gave her a generous divorce settlement. SC&P eventually allowed him to come back on the condition that he stop drinking on the job. He did his work well and eventually assumed his old position with the company. Following Bert Cooper's death, Roger Sterling, with Draper and other partners' support, sold SC&P to McCann as an independent and separate subsidiary. The arrangement lasted for a year before McCann decided to fully absorb SC&P. McCann's executives groomed Draper as management material, but he panicked at the thought of being tied down and left the company in the middle of a meeting.

Draper then embarked on a nomadic existence as a mechanic and in the series' final episode, "Person to Person", moved into a commune with Anna's niece Stephanie (Caity Lotz). In the last scene of the episode and series, he sits and meditates, with a smile on his face. His ultimate fate is left ambiguous: In their reviews of the final episode, some critics said that the episode's final shot—the iconic 1971 "I'd Like to Buy the World a Coke" ad, produced by McCann Erickson—implied that the episode did not provide a definite ending to Draper's story, while others noted that Peggy's last conversation with Don was a phone call inviting him to work with her on a new client she just landed, Coca-Cola, suggests Draper returned to advertising and created that commercial.

Personality 

Despite his outward cynicism and egotism, the character of Don Draper demonstrates a strict code of personal ethics, insisting on honesty and chivalry in his subordinates, but not always in himself. He is protective of his subordinates, admonishing Pete Campbell in the pilot about his rude remarks to and about Peggy Olson. Draper is also protective of his colleagues; for example, he berates several subordinates for mocking Freddy Rumsen's (Joel Murray) episode of urinary incontinence, a symptom of Rumsen's alcoholism.

Draper adheres to a stricter code of business ethics than many of his colleagues. A Season 2 arc has him upset about being told to drop the smaller local Mohawk Airlines as a client in hopes of picking up American Airlines. In Season 3, he is hesitant to sign a wealthy client eager to pour his fortune into promoting jai alai, a sport the client thinks will replace baseball as "America's game", which Draper thinks is a doomed enterprise. He is also the only partner to protest a scheme hatched by Pete Campbell and a potential client that involves Joan's sleeping with a Jaguar Cars executive in order to secure the account. 

Draper briefly becomes a confidant to art director Sal Romano, a closeted homosexual whom Draper finds in a compromising position with another man in a Baltimore hotel. On their way back to New York, Draper gently lets Romano know he is aware of his homosexuality and couches his comments about their London Fog account artwork to offer him advice about being cautious. Later on, when Romano won't give in to Lucky Strike executive Lee Garner Jr.'s (Darren Pettie) sexual demands, Garner has him fired. Romano goes to Draper for help, but when he explains what happened, Draper tells him he supports his dismissal, since Lucky Strike is too big a client to lose, and implies that Romano should have given Garner what he wanted. In contrast to the tolerant attitude he had earlier shown his colleague, he regards Romano now with homophobic disdain.

While the Don Draper character is not color-blind in matters of race, he recognizes the changes sweeping the country and acknowledges the advertising potential of "the Negro market". In the pilot, he is seen asking a black waiter about the waiter's cigarette preferences. In another episode, he attends a festive Kentucky Derby party hosted by Roger Sterling and watches with disgust as Sterling serenades his young wife in blackface. Draper and Pete Campbell seem to be the only guests who disapprove of, or are uncomfortable with, the spectacle.

Draper is loyal to many of his coworkers, and is particularly close to Peggy Olson and Joan Harris; two women he has only had a completely platonic relationship with. Draper and Pete Campbell initially dislike one another, as Draper at first sees Pete as the spoiled son of a wealthy "old money" New York City family, who received his job because of his family connections rather than professional talent. They eventually grow to respect each other, however, and a work friendship develops.  Draper watches Pete become a smart and driven advertising executive. Draper also has a close relationship with Roger Sterling. They are generally depicted as overlooking each other's personal failings and supporting one another at work. Roger saves a drunken Draper from drowning after the latter falls into a swimming pool while they are attending a party in Hollywood. Meanwhile, Draper inspires Roger to refocus his efforts at SCDP, causing Roger to engineer the firm's acquisition of the Chevrolet account. Roger fights to get Draper reinstated at SCDP after his forced leave of absence.

Draper is occasionally shown to regret how he treats his family. When Betty gives birth to their third child, he has a conversation with another man in the hospital waiting room who says he's going to be a better man for his wife and child. Although it is implied that Draper has similar convictions, he later acknowledges to his second wife that he feels a general state of disconnect between himself and his children. Draper's one consistent display of parental behavior is that he cannot tolerate Betty's often harsh treatment of Sally, and he has interceded on her behalf on those occasions.

Draper detests his father-in-law, Eugene "Gene" Hofstadt (Ryan Cutrona), but agrees to take him into their home when Gene is no longer able to live on his own. At multiple points, Draper shows more patience and understanding toward his father-in-law than his wife. After Gene's death, however, Draper tells Betty that he and her father hated each other.

Like many other characters in the series Draper is a heavy drinker, with his cocktail of choice being an Old Fashioned. While Canadian Club is his preferred liquor, bottles of Crown Royal, Jameson, Wild Turkey, Smirnoff, Beefeater, and Tanqueray can also be seen in his home and office.

Throughout the series, Draper displays signs of alcoholism, which eventually deteriorates to a level of alcohol dependency that endangers his job. In Season 4, following his divorce from Betty, his drinking reaches a point that he begins experiencing alcoholic blackouts, resulting in his keeping a journal as means of coming to terms with his situation and cutting down on his consumption. By the end of season 6, having battled constantly with his crisis of identity, Draper is forced to take a leave of absence after revealing the truth about his upbringing to the would-be lucrative and prestigious client, Hershey's. His confession is brought on by a pre-presentation round of drinks, and is the concluding incident in a long line of other drinking-related incidents that lead the partners of SC&P to finally take action; they put him on indefinite leave. Draper is hired back during Season 7, with a sobriety clause in his new contract. He violates these terms when he realizes during a conversation regarding new business with Bert Cooper that he is no longer valued as an active player in the agency. The other partners however do not realize this because Freddy Rumsen, who has since achieved sobriety, receives a call from Draper and takes him out of the office under the pretense of seeing a New York Mets game thereby keeping him away from the office until he sobers up the next morning. By the end of Season 7, Draper has succeeded in curbing his drinking, and has secured his position at the new Sterling Cooper with the help of Roger Sterling. However, since his divorce from Betty he has consistently fluctuated between problem drinking and moderation depending on his personal circumstances.

Relationships

Don Draper and women 

Don Draper met his future wife, Betty Hofstadt, when she was working as a model, later surprising her when he purchased a fur she wore during a photo shoot. With that gesture being the start of their relationship, Betty and Don were soon married. The couple later has their first child, Sally, soon followed by a son, Bobby. In Season 3, the Drapers have another son, Gene, named after Betty's recently deceased father.

Don cheats on his wife repeatedly throughout Seasons 1 and 2. In Season 1, he is involved with Midge Daniels (Rosemarie DeWitt), a pot-smoking artist and beatnik who works out of a small apartment in Greenwich Village. Her bohemian lifestyle and friends do not appeal to Don, but their relationship offers him an escape from his high-pressure job and life of responsibilities. When he receives a bonus check of $2,500 from Sterling Cooper, he asks her to vacation with him in Paris. He changes his mind after realizing Midge is in love with a fellow beatnik, and instead stuffs the check into her blouse, telling her to 'go buy a car' with it. Don doesn't see her again until Season 4, when Midge pretends to inadvertently run into him with the hope of selling a painting to help fund her heroin addiction. He agrees to visit her apartment but, after learning of her true intentions, somberly purchases a painting and leaves.

During and after his affair with Midge, Don pursues Rachel Menken (Maggie Siff), the daughter of Abraham Menken, the elderly Jewish founder of the upscale Menken's Department Store. Rachel is educated, sophisticated, and a savvy businesswoman, assisting her father in running the family business. Despite bickering with her during their initial business meetings, Don and she become intimate, and they eventually begin an affair. Their relationship collapses after he professes a desire to run away with her, prompting Rachel to realize Draper simply wants an excuse to run away and forget his responsibilities. She leaves on a cruise to Europe and marries sometime before the beginning of Season 2.

In Season 2, Draper has an affair with Bobbie Barrett (Melinda McGraw), the wife of Jimmy Barrett (Patrick Fischler), an insult comic who is filming a commercial for one of Sterling Cooper's clients, Utz Potato Chips. Don admires her savvy and boldness and the pair enter into a sexualized power struggle. They continue their affair, taking a trip to Bobbie's beach house in Stony Brook on Long Island, but their plans are interrupted by a car accident. Arrested for drunk driving and unable to post bond with the cash on his person, Don reaches out to Peggy, who travels from Brooklyn to Long Island in the middle of the night to post his bail. Bobbie stays with Peggy until her injuries from the accident heal. The affair between Draper and Bobbie continues until the episode "Maidenform", when she lets it slip that his previous mistresses have been talking about his sexual prowess. Because he highly values his privacy, Draper is disgusted that his extramarital escapades are being gossiped about, and immediately ends the affair. He must continue his professional relationship with the Barretts. The Drapers and the Barretts meet at the Stork Club for a night out. At the end of the evening, Jimmy reveals to Betty that their spouses have had an affair. When Betty confronts him, Draper repeatedly denies the accusations, infuriating her.

The strain leads to Don and Betty's first separation, and he moves into a hotel room.  His father-in-law has another stroke, necessitating a visit from Don at the Hofstadt home to keep up the appearance of a happy marriage. In his post-stroke confusion, Hofstadt openly expresses his disdain for his son-in-law, saying, "He's got no people. You can't trust a man like that." Don comforts Betty, who is distraught at her father's decline, and they have sex, leading Don to believe that Betty has forgiven him. When they arrive home, however, Betty tells him not to move back in, saying "We were only pretending."

His life in flux, Don impulsively decides to join Pete Campbell on a business trip to Los Angeles. In California, he meets a mysterious European viscount with a 21-year-old daughter named Joy (Laura Ramsay). Despite telling Campbell that the trip is strictly business, Draper joins Joy and her "jet set" family of self-described nomads at their lavish vacation home in Palm Springs. He sleeps with her the same night then leaves Joy the next morning to visit Anna Draper, who convinces him to return home to his wife and family. Later, Draper returns to Ossining and tells Betty he "wasn't respectful" to her. Betty reveals she is pregnant.

In episode 1 of season 3, Don and colleague Salvatore Romano (Bryan Batt) go on a business trip to Baltimore. Don has a one-night-stand with stewardess Shelly (Laura Beth Coakley), who tells Don she's engaged and that this may be the only chance she has left to dally. He responds: "I've been married a long time; you get plenty of chances."

In Season 3, Don has an affair lasting several months with his daughter's schoolteacher, Suzanne Farrell (Abigail Spencer). Their relationship builds slowly over several accidental meetings and conversations laden with innuendo. Don becomes infatuated by Suzanne's optimism and kindness and they finally consummate their relationship in September 1963. On October 30, 1963, he plans a weekend get-away with Suzanne, believing his wife and children are out of town. While Suzanne waits in the car, he enters his house to retrieve a suitcase and is stunned to find Betty at home. She reveals that she's found a key to the locked drawer in Draper's desk and discovered the box of photographs and other evidence of his past life, as well as several hundred dollars in emergency escape funds. Forced to reveal his true identity, Don never returns to the car and Suzanne eventually walks home. Even though they have not been discovered, he calls her the next day to break off the relationship. Draper begins an unsuccessful attempt to save his marriage, but Betty uses his lies about his life and past as an excuse to divorce him in order to marry Henry Francis, an aide to New York State governor Nelson Rockefeller.

Following the dissolution of his marriage, Don's relationship with women reaches its nadir during Season 4, which takes place from 1964 to 1965. At the beginning of Season 4, set in 1964, he hires a prostitute named Candace (Erin Cummings) to slap him during sex. Roger Sterling's wife, Jane Sterling (Peyton List), sets Draper up with Bethany (Anna Camp), a friend of hers. They go on three dates, but the relationship goes nowhere, as he regards her as sweet and pretty, but interchangeable. After winning at the Clio Awards and during a weekend of heavy drinking, Draper goes to bed with one woman and blacks out, wakes up with a different woman, and has no recollection of what has happened. He continues to visit the prostitute and pay her, eventually setting Lane Pryce up with the prostitute one night in his apartment. While on a trip to California he visits Anna in San Pedro, and attempts to seduce her 18-year-old niece Stephanie. Because she has known Draper since she was a child, she declines and tells him that her aunt has cancer. Later in the season, as Anna is on her deathbed, Draper repeatedly contemplates calling her, but can't bring himself to say goodbye until it's too late.

When Draper goes home drunk after an office Christmas party, he forgets the keys to his apartment. He asks Allison (Alexa Alemanni), his secretary, to deliver the keys to him. Having had a crush on him all along, she retrieves his keys and brings them back to his apartment, where Draper is barely conscious. Instead of leaving his keys and going back to the party, Allison invites herself inside and offers to cook for him.  He refuses and collapses onto his couch. As she begins to leave, Draper makes a pass at her; she returns the attention and has sex with him. This later creates tension in their professional relationship when Draper tries to act as if nothing happened and gives her a large Christmas bonus to make up for her inadvertently hurt feelings. Confused and heartbroken, Allison decides she can no longer work for him or the agency and finds another job. She asks Don to write a letter of recommendation for her; he tells her that she can write it herself and that he will sign off on whatever she writes. Insulted and enraged, she throws a brass cigarette dispenser at him, calls him "a bad person", and storms out in tears. Visibly shaken by the encounter, Draper later attempts to write a letter of apology to her, but then decides to leave it be.

Later in Season 4, Draper becomes friendly with Dr. Faye Miller (Cara Buono), a consumer psychologist he frequently works with. At the beginning of 1965, before the two start dating, she informs him, "you'll be married by the end of the year." After fending off his gentlemanly advances on several occasions, she begins a romantic relationship with him. During an extreme anxiety attack after believing he'd been discovered as the AWOL Dick Whitman, Don reveals his checkered past to Faye. She responds with sympathy and emotional support, and advises he confront the issues in his life and turn himself in. In another episode, Sally suddenly shows up at the agency's offices, and Draper asks Faye to look after his daughter; Faye warns him she is not good with children, is inexperienced around them, and does not have maternal feelings. At the end of the same episode, Sally flees from Draper, runs down the hall, then trips and falls into the arms of Draper's new secretary, Megan Calvet, who consoles the child much more effectively than Faye did. Faye feels forced into the situation and gets angry at Draper for asking her to watch his daughter, telling him, "it felt like a test, and I failed."

As Season 4 progresses, Draper is no longer visiting prostitutes and seems to have settled down with Faye. Although he seems to be satisfied in his relationship with her, he begins to notice and grow close with his secretary, Megan. Draper is surprised when Megan reveals herself to be intelligent, liberal, and eager to learn from him and Peggy about advertising. His business faces a severe hardship that indirectly threatens his and Faye's relationship. Megan seeks to help relieve his tensions and the pair have sex in his office one night; he is ambivalent at first, but she assuredly tells him not to worry because she only wants to have sex with him and she won't make a scene about it. With Faye's consulting firm no longer working with SCDP, she is pleased because she and Draper can now be "out in the open" with their relationship.

During the Season 4 finale, "Tomorrowland," Faye believes their relationship is stronger than ever. However, when Betty suddenly fires her children's long-time nanny, Draper scrambles to find a nanny for his three children for their upcoming visit to California and, remembering how good Megan was with children previously, asks her to accompany them on the trip. He goes to Anna's house one last time, and Stephanie tells him that Anna left him the diamond solitaire engagement ring given to her by the real Don Draper upon their engagement. Draper ends up sleeping with Megan during the trip. On returning to New York, Don impulsively decides to propose to her with the engagement ring. He tells her the ring is very special to him and that he "finally feels like himself" with her. Megan accepts, and, subsequently, Draper telephones Faye, and breaks off their relationship by informing her of his engagement. Draper also informs Betty as she is packing up the last moving box from the home they shared together in Ossining.

When the fifth season opens, in May 1966, it is revealed that Draper has told Megan all about his past and his real identity. It is also revealed that they married sometime between seasons four and five (between October 1965 and May 1966) and have moved into a penthouse apartment on Park Avenue and 73rd. Over the course of the first year of their marriage, Draper is besotted with Megan and her natural skill at her work. When Megan decides she wants to quit advertising to pursue her dream of being an actress, Draper is initially skeptical and his feelings hurt, but wanting to make her happy, he relents. He remains fearful of her acting career, and they begin to argue more frequently. One of these arguments is over his past relationships, when they encounter one of his former girlfriends, Andrea Rhodes (Mädchen Amick). After encountering Rhodes, Don develops a severe fever and leaves work early to lie down. While he is sleeping, he hallucinates that Rhodes enters his apartment and forces herself upon him sexually even as he tries to tell her "no". Rhodes describes a scene of the past of them having sex, while Betty is waiting for him around the corner. The fever dream climaxes with Draper "killing" her. When he wakes the next morning, fever broken, he is terrified before realizing that it was all just a dream and that Megan has been with him all night, nursing him back to health.

In the sixth season, sometime before January 1968, Draper begins an affair with his married downstairs neighbor, Sylvia Rosen (Linda Cardellini). They both feel discontented with their respective marriages and enjoy the thrill and convenience of their secret affair, but struggle to balance feelings of guilt; Draper is friends with Sylvia's husband Arnold (Brian Markinson) and Sylvia is close with Megan. In June 1968, the two of them engage in a days-long BDSM sexual role-play game in a Manhattan hotel. After having a dream about the two of them that she saw as an omen, Sylvia ends their affair. When Draper later helps Sylvia's son avoid service in Vietnam, their affair temporarily resumes until Sally discovers them together.

As the series ends in season seven, Draper, now divorced a second time, is reminded of Rachel while dealing with a conflict at work. He reaches out to her only to discover that she has died of cancer. Not long after, he runs into Diana Bauer (Elizabeth Reaser), a waitress who bears a resemblance to Rachel. The two begin an affair, but it comes crashing down when it's revealed Diana is dealing with her past. Draper encourages her to forget it and move on, but she insists that ignoring past hurts is the wrong way to deal with life, and the two go their separate ways.

Reception 

Hamm's portrayal of Don Draper received acclaim from critics and audiences alike.

Dan Fienberg of HitFix wrote "Hamm's performance as Don Draper is the decade's definitive star turn, a breakout on par with what George Clooney did on ER for a brief period of the '90s. All Jon Hamm had to do was convince producers that there was value in Jon Hamm and he's done that in spades. If Matthew Weiner has occasionally pushed up against the limits of Hamm's range, it's only because Draper has been written as such a tortured and frequently unravelling character. To my mind, every time you think you've seen Hamm hit a wall, you get an episode like 'The Hobo Code' or 'For Those Who Think Young' or 'Meditations in an Emergency' or, especially, this past season's 'The Gypsy and the Hobo.'" Bee Wilson of The Guardian praised Hamm's performance writing that "The Eames chairs and hour-glass dresses are a visual treat, but it's really all about Jon Hamm's performance as a man sickened by his womanising and in thrall to his own pretty lies".

In 2009, Ask Men named the fictional Don Draper the most influential man in the world, ahead of real-life figures. Additionally, Comcast listed him among TV's Most Intriguing Characters.

In 2010, Entertainment Weekly included Draper on its list of The 100 Greatest Characters of the Last 20 Years, and in 2015, they named Draper one of the 25 Best TV Characters of the Past 25 Years.

Hamm received eight nominations for the Primetime Emmy Award for Outstanding Lead Actor in a Drama Series for every season that Mad Men was eligible. Hamm failed to win seven times, losing out four times to Bryan Cranston for his portrayal of Walter White in Breaking Bad. Many critics felt that Matthew Weiner unnecessarily split up the final season of Mad Men over two parts and two years so Hamm would have an opportunity for the Emmy at last, since Breaking Bad had already ended its final season. Hamm indeed won his final nomination at the 67th Primetime Emmy Awards. Hamm crawled onto the stage, making fun of his nearly decade long quest to win an Emmy.

In addition to his Emmy, Hamm won the Golden Globe Award for Best Actor - Television Series Drama twice, in 2008 and 2016. He is tied with Ed Asner, John Forsythe, Hugh Laurie and Tom Selleck for most wins in the category. He also won the TCA Award for Individual Achievement in Drama twice, in 2011 and 2015; won the Critics' Choice Television Award for Best Actor in a Drama Series in 2011; and received six nominations for the Screen Actors Guild Award for Outstanding Performance by a Male Actor in a Drama Series.

References

Further reading

External links 
 Don Draper at AMCtv.com

Mad Men characters
Fictional businesspeople
Fictional characters from Pennsylvania
Fictional characters from New York (state)
Fictional Korean War veterans
Fictional Republicans (United States)
Fictional alcohol abusers
Fictional advertising executives
Fictional business executives
Television characters introduced in 2007
Fictional impostors
Fictional United States Army personnel
Fictional orphans
American male characters in television
Fictional victims of child sexual abuse